The Municipality of the County of Victoria  is a county municipality on Cape Breton Island, Nova Scotia, Canada. It provides local government to about 7,000 residents of the eponymous historical county except for the Wagmatcook 1 reserve. The municipal offices are in the village of Baddeck.

History
Prior to European settlement, the area was sparsely inhabited by the Miꞌkmaq, who hunted in the area.

French Jesuits settled at St. Anns in 1629. British settlement began in the 1700s after the territory was had been by France.

In 1839, a property containing an inn, a tavern, and a post office was built in Baddeck. In 1841, Charles James Campbell opened a store, began shipbuilding, and developed coal mining.

In 1851, Victoria County was split from Cape Breton County, and Baddeck became the site for the new county's jail and court house, and later the site of Alexander Graham Bell's Beinn Bhreagh, a summer residence and research centre, and the Bell Boatyard. Bell is commemorated at the Alexander Graham Bell National Historic Site.

The county is named for Queen Victoria.

Demographics 

Economy
Fishing and tourism are the main industries.

See also
Communities in Victoria County, Nova Scotia
Cabot Trail: a scenic drive that circles Cape Breton Highlands National Park in the north of the municipality.

References

External links
Municipality of Victoria County website

 
Victoria